
Gmina Serokomla is a rural gmina (administrative district) in Łuków County, Lublin Voivodeship, in eastern Poland.

Villages
Gmina Serokomla contains the villages and settlements of Bielany Duże, Bronisławów Duży, Bronisławów Mały, Charlejów, Czarna, Ernestynów, Hordzież, Józefów Duży, Krzówka, Leonardów, Nowa Ruda, Pieńki, Poznań, Ruda, Serokomla, Wola Bukowska and Wólka.

Neighbouring gminas
Gmina Serokomla is bordered by the gminas of Adamów, Jeziorzany, Kock and Wojcieszków.

References
Polish official population figures 2006

Serokomla
Łuków County